During the 1894–95 English football season, New Brompton F.C. competed in the Southern Football League Division Two.  It was the first season in which the team took part in a league competition. The club had been formed a year earlier but in its inaugural season played only friendly matches and games in the qualifying rounds of the FA Cup and FA Amateur Cup.  In 1894 New Brompton turned professional and joined the newly-formed Southern League; the team dominated Division Two of the new league, winning all but one of their matches, and went on to clinch promotion to Division One by winning an end-of-season "test match" against Swindon Town, who had finished bottom of the higher division. 

New Brompton also entered the FA Cup, reaching the third qualifying round.  The team played 15 competitive matches, winning 13, drawing none, and losing 2.  Arthur Rule was the team's top goalscorer; he scored 18 goals in the regular league season and 4 in the test match.  Harry Buckland and Alf Meager made the most appearances, both playing in every match.  The highest attendance recorded at the club's home, the Athletic Ground, was approximately 8,000 for the visit of near-neighbours Chatham in the FA Cup.

Background and pre-season 
The New Brompton club had been formed in May 1893 by a group of local businessmen keen to organise a club which could compete in national competitions.  During the 1893–94 season, New Brompton entered the FA Cup and FA Amateur Cup, being eliminated in the qualifying rounds of both competitions, but did not play in any league.

The Southern League was formed in 1894 by many of the leading clubs in the south of England at a time when the ostensibly national Football League included only one club not from the midlands and north of the country.  Keen to secure a regular schedule of high-quality matches, the New Brompton committee, led by chairman H.G. Croneen, applied to join the league.  The club was invited to join and allocated a place in Division Two, the lower of the new league's two divisions, due to the fact that near-neighbours Chatham had already been placed in Division One.  Days earlier, New Brompton had switched from amateur to professional status, with the players to be paid 12 shillings per match (equivalent to £73 in 2021).  

Many players from the previous season agreed to professional terms and remained, and the club also signed Joe Dickenson, formerly of Bolton Wanderers of the Football League First Division.  Dickenson, who had been born in nearby Chatham, had recently been in the Bolton team which lost to Notts County in the 1894 FA Cup final.  The concept of a manager did not yet exist; significant team decisions were made by the committee or by David Hutcheson, the captain, and the club employed a trainer called Murray.  The players wore black and white striped shirts and black shorts.  Ahead of the new season, New Brompton played a friendly against Barking Swifts and won 17–0; more than a century later this remained the highest score ever achieved by the club in any match.  New Brompton were seen as strong contenders for the championship of the division: a writer for the Middlesex and Buckinghamshire Advertiser stated that "according to some who profess to speak with authority, the Bromptonians are likely to be at the head of the Leagueists."

Southern League 

New Brompton's first Southern League game was away to Sheppey United on 15 September 1894. In front of a crowd of approximately 3,000 fans New Brompton were forced to begin the game with only ten players as goalkeeper A. Russell failed to arrive.  The team played with no goalkeeper for around ten minutes until Alf Jenner, normally a forward, assumed the position and a reserve player took to the field.  New Brompton emerged victorious by a score of 6–0, Hutcheson scoring a hat-trick.  The first game at New Brompton's home, the Athletic Ground, took place a week later and resulted in a 4–0 victory over Uxbridge, who played the whole game with only ten men.

League play did not resume until 1 December, when New Brompton played Old St Stephen's; Fred Manning and Arthur Rule each scored twice in a 5–2 win described by the Chesham Examiner as "easy".  In the team's final game of the calendar year, they won 7–2 away to Chesham.  A. Webb scored a hat-trick in what would prove to be his only competitive appearance for the team.  Half-back L. Watson made his debut in the game at home to Maidenhead on 19 January, having been signed by the club after he impressed in an inter-county match between teams representing Kent and Sussex.  W. Thomas also made his debut and scored one of the goals.  A week later, New Brompton defeated Sheppey at home to maintain their record of having won every league game.  The Athletic News reported that Sheppey had their goalkeeper to thank for  keeping the margin of the defeat down, and noted that Russell, New Brompton's goalkeeper, was "almost a spectator".

New Brompton's run of victories continued with wins away to Maidenhead and Uxbridge, both without conceding a goal.  The team only scored two goals in the latter game, the fewest they had yet achieved in a Southern League match, and an Uxbridge newspaper reporter claimed to have heard that the New Brompton players "admitted that it was the toughest fight they have had in the League tournament".  New Brompton's only defeat of the season came on 9 March when they lost 3–1 at home to Bromley.  Athletic News columnist "Grasshopper" attributed the defeat to "the deplorable state of the ground".  Dickenson was absent from the team for the only time during the season.  Two weeks later the teams met again at Bromley's ground and New Brompton won 3–2 in what the East Kent Gazette described as a "keen struggle".  The team's final two games of the regular league season took place on consecutive days.  On 12 April, the team beat Old St Stephen's 6–0 away from home; Rule scored three of the goals, the team's third Southern League hat-trick of the season.  The following day New Brompton played Chesham at home and won 9–0;  Lloyd's Weekly Newspaper reported that the team "simply made rings round their opposition". Rule scored five goals to take his total for the league season to 18.  New Brompton finished the season with a record of 11 wins in 12 games; their total of 57 goals scored was more than twice that achieved by any other team in the division and Rule alone scored more goals than the entire team of fourth-placed Uxbridge.

League match details
Key

In result column, New Brompton's score shown first
H = Home match
A = Away match

o.g. = Own goal

Results

Partial league table

Test match 
Although New Brompton finished top of Division Two, this did not guarantee the club promotion to Division One.  Instead, the team were required to play a "test match" against Swindon Town, who had finished bottom of Division One, the winners of which would play in the higher division in the subsequent season.  The match was played at a neutral venue in Caversham, near Reading.  Rule scored four times as New Brompton won 5–1 to gain promotion.  The Southern League ultimately decided to expand Division One from nine teams to ten for the subsequent season, so Swindon retained their place despite losing the match.

Test match details
Key

In result column, New Brompton's score shown first
H = Home match
A = Away match
N = Match played at neutral venue

Results

FA Cup 
Having received a bye in the first qualifying round, New Brompton entered the 1894–95 FA Cup at the second qualifying round stage and were paired with Chatham of the Southern League Division One.  The match between two teams from neighbouring towns in the Medway area drew a crowd of approximately 8,000 fans, the largest recorded attendance to date at the Athletic Ground.  Dickenson scored a hat-trick in a 3–0 win for the home team; as New Brompton had been eliminated at the earliest stage in the previous season's FA Cup, this was the club's first victory in the competition.  In the third qualifying round, New Brompton faced another Southern League Division One team, Millwall Athletic.  Although New Brompton had beaten Millwall in a friendly earlier in the year, they lost the cup game 2–0 and were eliminated from the competition.

FA Cup match details
Key

In result column, New Brompton's score shown first
H = Home match
A = Away match

Results

Players 
During the course of the season, 18 players made at least one competitive appearance for New Brompton.  Harry Buckland and Alf Meager made the most, both playing in all 15 games. 
Dickenson, Hutcheson, Dan Pellatt and A. Ashdown each missed only one game.  Webb and R. Read each played only once and in both cases it was the player's only match for the New Brompton first team.  Rule's 22 goals made him the team's top scorer; Hutcheson had the second highest total, with 13.  

FW = Forward, HB = Half-back, GK = Goalkeeper, FB = Full-back

Aftermath
Leading goalscorer Rule did not play for New Brompton again after the 1894–95 season; Dickenson also left, although he would briefly return in 1903.  In their first season in Division One, the team finished 6th out of 10 clubs in Division One.  The club, which changed its name to Gillingham in 1912, remained in the division until 1920 when it was incorporated in its entirety into the Football League to form its new Third Division.

References

Works cited
 
 
 

1894-95
English football clubs 1894–95 season